Eubrontes is the name of fossilised dinosaur footprints dating from the Late Triassic and Early Jurassic. They have been identified from France, Poland, Slovakia, Czech Republic, Italy, Spain, Sweden, Australia (Queensland), USA,  India and China.

Eubrontes is the name of the footprints, identified by their shape, and not of the genus or genera that made them, which is as yet unknown but is presumed to be similar to Coelophysis or Dilophosaurus. They are most famous for their discovery in the Connecticut River Valley of Massachusetts in the early 19th century. They, among other footprints, were the first known non-avian dinosaur tracks to be discovered in North America, though they were initially thought to have been made by large birds.

Discovery and identity
The footprints were first described by Edward Hitchcock, a professor of Amherst College, who thought they were made by a large bird. He originally assigned them to ichnotaxon Ornithichnites in 1836, then Ornithoidichnites in 1841, before coining Eubrontes in 1845. The name means "true thunder," probably referring to the supposed weight of the animal impacting on the ground.

in 1858 Hitchcock still described the tracks as those of "a thick-toed bird," since there was no evidence of tail drag marks. But by the time that Richard Swann Lull began working on the tracks in 1904, they were thought to belong to a dinosaur. Lull originally thought they were from a herbivore, but by 1953 he concluded they were from a carnivorous theropod. Many later authors have agreed with this interpretation, but some have suggested that they are from a prosauropod. Regardless, they are almost certainly saurischian.

A typical Eubrontes print is from 25–50 cm long, with three toes that terminate in sharp claws. It belongs to a biped that must have been over one metre high at the hip and from 5–6 metres long. In the 1960s Edwin Colbert and others supposed that a large heavy carnivore like Teratosaurus (then considered to be a dinosaur) made the track, but a possible candidate is Dilophosaurus, a large theropod related to Coelophysis, or a close relative such as Podokesaurus. However no Dilophosaurus fossil material is associated with Eubrontes tracks. The tracks may also be from a plateosaurid. In 2016 Molina-Perez and Larramendi based on the 45 cm (1.48 ft) long footprint estimated the size of the animal at 8.4 meters (27.5 ft) and 600 kg (1.323 lbs). Another 60.5 cm (1.98 ft) long footprint belongs to an 8.1 meter (26.6 ft), 1.1 tonne (2.425 lbs) individual, that was very similar to Sinosaurus triassicus.

Another major find occurred at Rocky Hill, Connecticut in 1966. Nearly 600 prints are preserved there in an area now designated Dinosaur State Park.

Paleopathology
A trackway attributed to the ichnogenus Eubrontes had a missing second digit on the right foot. The animal could have either lost the toe due to injury or it was malformed.

In popular culture
In early 1970s, a fiberglass cast of an Eubrontes giganteus footprint was made by Paul E. Olsen, then 14 years old, and his friend Tony Lessa. On June 29, 1972, it was sent by Olsen and Lessa to President Richard Nixon to get his support for registering the Riker Hill Fossil Site in Roseland, New Jersey as a National Natural Landmark.

In 1991, Eubrontes was named the state fossil of Connecticut.

See also
 List of dinosaur ichnogenera

 Connecticut River Valley trackways
 List of Australian and Antarctic dinosaurs
 Grallator
 Anomoepus
 Dilophosaurus
 Edward Hitchcock

Notes

References
 Colbert, E., Dinosaurs, Hutchinson & Co, 1962
 
 Queensland Dinosaur Trackways home.alphalink.com.au/dannj/larkqury.htm

Dinosaur trace fossils
Fossil trackways
Symbols of Connecticut